Nienke is Dutch feminine given name. It originated as a diminutive of Nine, a Frisian short form of Catharina. People with the name include:

Nienke van Hichtum (1860–1939), Dutch children's author
Nienke Hommes (born 1977), Dutch rower
Nienke Kingma (born 1982), Dutch rower
Nienke Kremers (born 1985), Dutch field hockey player

References

Dutch feminine given names